Bhagjan (I don't wanna Sit in my cemetery) is an Assamese-Moran bilingual film directed and written by filmmaker Jaicheng Jai Dohutia and produced by Mayamara Productions. The film is about the biggest industrial disasters; oil-leakage tragedy of 2020 at Baghjan.

Plot 
A prosperous oil and gas field surrounds the little village where fisherman Manab and his wife Bharabi reside. One day, while extracting oil, a huge explosion occurs, setting the entire community ablaze. The fire claims Bharabi's life. Manab cannot handle it. In the fire, he believes that his wife is still alive and is attempting to communicate with her.

Cast 

 Monuj Borkakoty
 Jadumoni Barua
 Pranali Bora
 Dandeswar Bora
 Sabita Bora
 Gunawati Hazarika
 Hemanta 
 Barbi
 Gargi Gogoi

Most of the actors of this film are the real victims of the oil-leakage tragedy.

Production 
Baghjan is an Indian film production. It has been made by Mayamara Productions in Baghjan, Tinsukia district, Assam.

Awards

Conflict 

On May 22, 2022, Dohutia voiced his disagreement with the State government's intention to send four people from the film business, including bureaucrats, to the Cannes Film Festival. He declared his intention to go to the festival to represent and promote the movie. In order for Dohutia and his crew to represent their film and the state in France, he also asked that the state government pay for their travel costs.

References

External links
 

2021 films
Assamese-language films